Til the Casket Drops may refer to:

Til the Casket Drops (Clipse album), 2009
Til the Casket Drops (ZZ Ward album), 2012